Sébastien Vigier (born 18 April 1997) is a French track cyclist, who competes in sprinting events. He competed at the 2016 UEC European Track Championships in the team sprint event.

He competed in the sprint and team sprint events at the 2020 Summer Olympics, winning bronze in the latter.

References

External links

1997 births
Living people
French male cyclists
French track cyclists
People from Palaiseau
Cyclists at the 2020 Summer Olympics
Olympic cyclists of France
Olympic bronze medalists for France
Olympic medalists in cycling
Medalists at the 2020 Summer Olympics